Zahattia is a village located in western Ukraine, within Khust Raion in Zakarpattia Oblast, although it was formerly administered under Irshava Raion. It was founded in 1350 on the river Irshavka, and in 1945 was called Hаtmeg.

Population
The village lives 2582 people. The majority of are Ukrainian. On the territory of the village council live 3647 people.

Attractions
In 1845 the village was built Zahattya Загаття Greek Catholic Church of the Nativity of the Blessed Virgin Mary

Villages in Khust Raion